Lars Kraus Jensen (born 7 August 1944) is a Danish former backstroke and medley swimmer. He competed at the 1964 Summer Olympics and the 1968 Summer Olympics.

References

External links
 

1944 births
Living people
Danish male backstroke swimmers
Danish male medley swimmers
Olympic swimmers of Denmark
Swimmers at the 1964 Summer Olympics
Swimmers at the 1968 Summer Olympics
Sportspeople from Frederiksberg